

This is a list of aircraft in numerical order of manufacturer beginning with a digit, followed by alphabetical order beginning with numeral '0' through 'Ah'.

3

EADS 3 Sigma 
 EADS 3 Sigma Nearchos

3I
see Iniziative Industriali Italiane
 3I Sky Arrow

3Xtrim Aircraft Factory 
 3Xtrim 3X47 Ultra
 3Xtrim 3X55 Trener
 3Xtrim Navigator 600

7

76th Fighter Squadron Inc
(Meadow Lake Airport, CO)
Rowley P-40F

A

A2 Czech Ltd
(Czech Republic)
 A2 CZ Ellipse Spirit

A41 Factory 
(Aircraft Repairing Company A-41)
 A41 Factory VNS-41

AA
(Arsenalul Aeronautic, Romania - see Arsenalul Aeronautic)
 AA Aeron

A.I.R.'s
 A.I.R.'s Maestro (Yakolev Yak-28U)
 A.I.R.'s Allegro

A-B Helicopters 
 A-B Helicopters A/W 95

A-I-R GmbH
(Halblech, Germany)
A-I-R Atos

AA & E
(Australian Aircraft & Engineering / N.B. Love, W.J. Warneford and H.E. Broadsmith)
 AA & E Commercial B1

AAA
(Advanced Amphibious Aircraft)
 AAA

AAA 
(American Affordable Aircraft)
 AAA Vision

AAC 
(Australian Aircraft Consortium pty.)
 AAC A10 Wamira
 AAC A20

AAC 
(Angel Aircraft Corporation.)
 AAC Angel

AAC 
(Amphibian Airplanes of Canada)
 AAC SeaStar
 AAC Seastar Sealoon

Aachener
(Aachener Segelflugzeugbau GmbH)
 Aachener K.F.

AAI 
(American Aircraft International)
 AAI Penetrator

AAI 
(American Autogyro Inc)
 AAI Sparrowhawk
 AAI Spinus

AAI 
(see NorthropGrumman)
 AAI RQ-2 Pioneer
 AAI RQ-7 Shadow
 AAI Aerosonde
 AAI Shadow 200
 AAI Shadow 400
 AAI Shadow 600

AAI 
(American Aviation Industries)
 AAI FanStar

AAMSA 
(Aeronáutica Agrícola Mexicana SA)
 AAMSA A9B-M Quail (Rockwell International Quail Commander)
 AAMSA Sparrow

AASI 
(Advanced Aerodynamics and Structures Inc., Burbank, CA)
 AASI Jetcruzer 450
 AASI Jetcruzer 500
 AASI Jetcruzer 650
 AASI Stratocruzer 1250
 AASI ML-1
 AASI ML-2
 AASI ML-4
 AASI ML-5

Abaris 
 Abaris Golden Arrow

Abbott 
(John L Abbott, Detroit, MI)
 Abbott Midwing

Abbott-Baynes Sailplanes Ltd
Abbott-Baynes Scud 1
Abbott-Baynes Scud 2
Abbott-Baynes Scud 3
Carden-Baynes Auxiliary
Baynes Cantilever Pou   - variant of Mignet HM.14 "Flying Flea"
Baynes Bat
Carden-Baynes Bee
Abbott-Baynes replica Antoinette monoplane
Baynes Heliplane

ABC Motors 
 ABC Robin

Abe 
(Keiichi Abe)
 Abe Midget
 Abe Mizet II

ABHCO 
(Arab British Helicopter Company)
 ABHCO Gazelle

Abraham 
(Edmond Abraham)
 Abraham Iris
 Abraham AS-2 Iris II

Abraham 
(Lewis Abraham, Portsmouth, VA)
 Abraham Z-1-X

Abramovich 
 Abramovich Flyer

Abrams 
(Abrams Air Craft Corp, 606 E Shiawassee St, Lansing, MI)
 Abrams P-1 Explorer

Abreu 
(Aeronautical Engineering Co, Oakland, CA)
 Abreu AE-5

Abrial 

 Levasseur-Abrial A-1
 Abrial A-2 Vautour
 Abrial A-3 Oricou
 Peyret-Abrial A-5 Rapace
 Abrial A-8
 Abrial A-12 Bagoas
 Abrial A-13 Buse
 Abrial A-260

Abric-Calas 
 Abric-Calas biplane
 Abric-Calas biplane glider

ABS Aerolight
(Sérignan-du-Comtat, France)
ABS Aerolight ATE
ABS Aerolight Legacy
ABS Aerolight Navigathor

ABS Aircraft 
 ABS Aircraft RF-9

Absolut-Marine 
 Absolut-Marine Seaplane

AC Millennium
(AC Millennium Corp, Edmonton, Alberta, Canada)
ARV Griffin

AC Mobil 34
AC Mobil 34 Chrysalin

ACA
( ACA Industries)
 ACA JW-1Development of NASA AD-1
 ACA JW-2Development of NASA AD-1
 ACA JW-3Development of NASA AD-1

ACAZ 
(Ateliers de Construction Aéronautique de Zeebruges)
 ACAZ C.2
 ACAZ T.1 
 ACAZ T.2

ACBA 
(Aéro Club du Bas Armagnac)
 ACBA-4
 ACBA-7 Midour
 ACBA-8 Midour 2
 ACBA Midour 3
 ACBA BM.101

Ace Aviation
(Kalhatti, Ooty, Tamil Nadu, India)
Ace Magic

Ace 
(Aircraft Engineering Corp, 535 E 79 St, New York, NY)
 Ace K-1

Ace 
(Ace Aircraft Mfg Co (Edwin T Jacobs),)
 Baby Ace Model D
 Baby Ace Model E Junior Ace

ACE 
(Essig Aero Advertising Service, Los Angeles, CA)
 A C E 1928 monoplane

Ace 
(Ace Aircraft Mfg Co, Asheville, NC)
 Ace Model D Baby Ace
 Ace Model E Junior Ace
 Ace Scooter

Aceair 
 Aceair Aeriks

Aces High 
 Aces High Cuby

ACHDB 
(Alekseyev Central Hydrofoil Design Bureau)
 ACHDB А-080-752
 ACHDB Spasatel
 ACHDB А-300-538
 ACHDB A-90 Orlyonok
 ACHDB Lun-class ekranoplan
 ACHDB Utka

Acier
 Acier monoplane

ACLA 
(Aero Consult Light Aircraft)
 AC Sirocco NG

Acme 
see Sierradyne

Acme 
(Acme Aircraft Corporation, Loves Park, Rockford, IL)
 Acme 1928 Biplane
 Acme Model 21 Sportsman

Acme 
(Acme Aircraft Co, Torrance, CA)
 Acme Centaur 101
 Acme Centaur 102
 Acme Sierra S-1 Sportplane Sierra Sue

ACME 
(Air Craft Marine Engineering Co)
 ACME Anser Amphibian

Acro 
(Acro Sport Inc, Hales Corners, WI)
 Acro Sport II
 Super Acro Sport

Acrolite Aircraft
(Kakabeka Falls, Ontario, Canada)
Acrolite 1A
Acrolite 1B
Acrolite 1C
Acrolite 1M
Acrolite 1T
Acrolite 2M

ACS-Itaipu
(ACS Aviation - Itaipu Binacional)
 ACS-Itaipu Sora-E

ACS
(Advanced Composites Solutions)
 ACS-100 Sora

Activian 
 Santa Ana VM-1

AD 
(Admiralty Air Department)
 AD Flying Boat
 AD Navyplane
 AD Scout (AD Sparrow)
 AD Seaplane Type 1000

AD & D
(Aero-Design & Development, Israel)
 AD & D Hummingbird

AD Aerospace 
 AD Aerospace T-211

ADA 
(Aeronautical Development Agency India)
 ADA AMCA

Adam 
(Designer:Roger Adam, France; Avianautic)
 Adam RA-10
 Adam RA-10S
 Adam RA-14 Loisirs
 Adam RA-15 Major
 Adam RA-17

Adam 
(Adam Aircraft Industries, Denver, CO)
 Adam M-309 CarbonAero
 Adam A500
 Adam A700 AdamJet

Adamoli-Cattani 
 Adamoli-Cattani fighter

Adams 
(J. Adams, Staten Island, NY)
 Adams B-4

Adams 
(see Thorp)

Adams-Toman 
(Adams-Toman Aircraft Co, Aberdeen, WA)
 ATA Cruiser

Adams-Wilson
(see Hobbycopter)
 Adams-Wilson Hobbycopter (1955)

Adaridi 
 Adaridi AD 3

Adaro 
 Adaro 1.E.7 Chirta

ADC
(Aircraft Disposal Company / Airdisco)
see:Airdisco

Adcox 
(Adcox Aviation Trades School (Aircraft Builders Corp), Portland, OR)
 Adcox 1-A
 Adcox Cloud Buster
 Adcox Special
 Adcox Student Prince

Addems 
(Walter J Addems, Loda, IL)
 Addems-Nieuport 11 Replica

Ader 
 Ader Éole (Avion I)
 Ader Avion II
 Ader Avion III
 Ader Avion IV (unfinished)

ADI 
(Aircraft Designs Inc., Monterey, CA)
 ADI Condor
 ADI Stallion
 ADI Sportster
 ADI Bumble Bee

Adkins 
(Cliff AdkinsParkston SD.)
 Adkins 1973 Monoplane
 Adkins Midwing

Adkisson 
(Earl and Jerry Adkisson, John Canfield, Lincoln, NE)
 Adkisson SJ-1 Head Skinner

Advance 
(Advance Aircraft Co)
 Advance 1923 Biplane

Advance Thun SA
(Thun, Switzerland)
Advance Alpha
Advance Bi Beta
Advance Epsilon
Advance Iota
Advance Omega
Advance Pi
Advance Sigma

Advanced Aeromarine 
 Advanced Aeromarine Buccaneer
 Advanced Aeromarine Carrera
 Advanced Aeromarine Mallard
 Advanced Aeromarine Sierra

Advanced Aircraft 
(Advanced Aircraft Corporation)
 Advanced Aircraft Turbine P-210 (Turbo-powered Cessna 210)
 Advanced Aircraft Regent 1500

Advanced Aviation 
 Advanced Aviation Cobra
 Advanced Aviation Explorer
 Advanced Aviation King Cobra
 Advanced Aviation Zephyr
 Advanced Aviation Husky
 Advanced Aviation Toucan
 Advanced Aviation Barracuda
 Advanced Aviation Hi-Nuski
 Advanced Aviation Coyote

Advanced Soaring Concepts 
 Advanced Soaring Concepts Falcon
 Advanced Soaring Concepts Spirit
 Advanced Soaring Concepts Apex

Adventure Air
 Adventure Air Adventurer 2+2
 Adventure Air Adventurer 333
 Adventure Air Heavy Hauler

Adventure Aircraft 
 Adventure Aircraft EMG-6

Adventure SA
(Méré, Yonne, France)
Adventure A series
Adventure F series
Adventure R series
Adventure S series
Adventure Wheely II

Ae. 
(from Dirección General de Aerotécnica (1927–1936))
 Ae. C.1
 Ae. C.2
 Ae. C.3
 Ae. C.3G
 Ae. C.4
 Ae. M.B.1 Bombi
 Ae. M.E.1
 Ae. M.O.1
 Ae. M.Oe.1
 Ae. M.Oe.2
 Ae. M.S.1
 Ae. T.1

AEA 
(Aerial Experimental Association)
 AEA Red Wing ("Aerodrome #1")
 AEA White Wing ("Aerodrome #2")
 AEA June Bug ("Aerodrome #3")
 AEA Loon ("Aerodrome #3-A")
 AEA Silver Dart ("Aerodrome #4")
 AEA Cygnet ("Aerodrome #5")

AEA 
(Aeronautical Engineers Australia Research Pty Ltd)
 AEA Explorer 350R
 AEA Explorer 500T (turboprop)
 AEA Explorer 500R (turboprop)
 AEA Maverick

AEC 
(Aircraft Engineering Corp. 535 E 79 St, New York, NY)
 AEC K-1 Ace

AEF Air Lift System
(Houllies, France)
AEF Monotrace

AEG
(Allgemeine Elektrizitäts Gesellschaft)
 AEG B.I
 AEG B.II
 AEG B.III
 AEG C.I
 AEG C.II
 AEG C.III
 AEG C.IV
 AEG C.IVN
 AEG C.V
 AEG C.VI
 AEG C.VII
 AEG C.VIII
 AEG C.VIII Dr
 AEG D.I
 AEG DJ.I
 AEG Dr.I
 AEG G.I
 AEG G.II
 AEG G.III
 AEG G.IV
 AEG G.V
 AEG J.I
 AEG J.II
 AEG K.I
 AEG N.I
 AEG PE
 AEG R.I
 AEG R.II 
 AEG Z.1
 AEG Z.2
 AEG Z.3
 AEG Z.6
 AEG Z.9
 AEG Typ KZ.9
 AEG Wagner Eule
 AEG Helicopter
 AEG Flugboot
 AEG S1

AEKKEA-RAAB 
(Anonymos Etaireia Kataskevis Kai Ekmetallefseos Aeroplanon - Societe Anonyme Pour la Fabrication et l'Exploitation des Avions Raab)
 AEKKEA-Raab R-29

Aer Lualdi 
See also: Lualdi-Tassotti
 Lualdi-Tassotti ES 53
 Aer Lualdi L.55
 Aer Lualdi L.57
 Aer Lualdi L.59

Aer Pegaso 
See also: CVT
 Aer Pegaso M 100S

Aerauto 
 Aerauto PL.5C

AEREON 
 AEREON Dynairship
 AEREON VectoRotor
 AEREON WASP
 AEREON III
 AEREON 26

Aerfer 
(Industrie Meccaniche Aeronautiche Meridionali-Aerfer)
See also: Ambrosini, Aeritalia
 Aerfer Ariete
 Aerfer Leone
 Aerfer Sagittario 2

Aerial Distributors 
(Aerial Distributors Inc, Wichita, KS)
 Aerial Distributors Distributor Wing
 Aerial Distributors DWI-1 Distributor Wing

Aerial Service
 Aerial Service Mercury Senior

Aerial Transport 
(Aerial Transport Corp, New York, NY)
 V.B.L.-1 (C D Air Express)

Aerial Wheel Syndicate 
 Aerial Wheel Syndicate Monoplane

Aériane 
 Aériane Sirocco
 Aériane SWIFT
 Aériane Tandem SWIFT
 Aériane SWIFT-PAS
 Aériane P-SWIFT
 Aériane SWIFT'Lite

Aerion 
 Aerion SBJ
 Aerion AS2
 Aerion AS3

Aeris Naviter 
 Aeris Naviter AN-2 Enara

Aeritalia 
See also: Fiat, Alenia, AMX International, Aerfer
 Aeritalia AM.3
 Aeritalia G.91
 Aeritalia G.222

Aermacchi 
See also: Macchi, AMX International
 Aermacchi AM.3
 Aermacchi AL-60 (Aermacchi-Lockheed/Lockheed Azcarate LASA 60/Lockheed 60)
 Aermacchi S-211
 Aermacchi SF.260
 Aermacchi M-290 RediGO
 Aermacchi M-311
 Aermacchi MB-326
 Aermacchi MB-335
 Aermacchi MB-338
 Aermacchi MB-339
 Aermacchi MB-340
 Aermacchi M-346
 AERMACCHI/DASA PTS-2000

Aermas
(Automobiles Martini SA)
 Aermas 386

Aernova 
 Aernova AER-1

Aero (Yugoslavia)
see Ikarus

Aero 
(Aero Tovàrna Letadel / Aero Vodochody Národní Podnik / "Aero Vodochody National Corporation")
 Aero Ae 01
 Aero Ae 02
 Aero Ae 03
 Aero Ae 04
 Aero Ae 10
 Aero A.1
 Aero A.8
 Aero A.10
 Aero A.11
 Aero A.12
 Aero A.14
 Aero A.15
 Aero A.17
 Aero A.18
 Aero A.19
 Aero A.20
 Aero A.21
 Aero A.22
 Aero A.23
 Aero A.24
 Aero A.25
 Aero A.26
 Aero A.27
 Aero A.29
 Aero A.30
 Aero A.32
 Aero A.34
 Aero A.35
 Aero A.38
 Aero A.42
 Aero A.46
 Aero A.100
 Aero A.101
 Aero A.102
 Aero A.104
 Aero A.125
 Aero A.130
 Aero A.134
 Aero A.200
 Aero A.204
 Aero A.230
 Aero A.300
 Aero A.304
 Aero A.330
 Aero A.430
 Aero Ae 50
 Aero Ae 270 Ibis
 Aero C-3A
 Aero C-3B
 Aero C-4
 Aero C-103
 Aero C-104
 Aero D-44
 Aero Z-35 Heli Trainer
 Aero F-10 Raptor
 Aero HC-2 Heli Baby
 Aero HC-3
 Aero HC-4
 Aero HC-102 Heli Baby
 Aero HC-202
 Aero LC-II
 Aero L-29 Delfin
 Aero L-39 Albatros
 Aero L-139 Albatros
 Aero L-59 Super Albatros
 Aero L-159 ALCA
 Aero L-60 Brigadyr
 Aero L-160 Brigadyr
 Aero MB.200
 Aero XE-I
 Aero XE-II
 Aero XE-IIA
 Aero XE-IIB
 Aero XE-IIC
 Aero XE-IIE
 Aero XE-IIF
 Aero 45
 Aero 145

Aero 
(Aero Sp.z o.o.)
 Aero AT-1
 Aero AT-2
 Aero AT-3
 Aero AT-4

Aero & Tech
(Fossato Di Vico, Italy)
Aero & Tech Nexth

Aero Adventure Aviation 
 Aero Adventure Aventura
 Aero Adventure Aventura II
 Aero Adventure Aventura II XLR
 Aero Adventure Aventura HP
 Aero Adventure Aventura UL
 Aero Adventure Barracuda
 Aero Adventure KP 2U-Sova
 Aero Adventure Toucan
 Aero Adventure Pegasus

Aero Boero 
 Aero Boero 260AG
 Aero Boero AB-95
 Aero Boero AB-115
 Aero Boero AB-150
 Aero Boero AB-180
 Aero Boero AB-210
 Aero Boero AB-260
 Aero Boero Tomahawk SP

Aero Bravo 
 Aero Bravo Bravo 700
 Aero Bravo Bravo 700 Agricola
 Aero Bravo Sky Ranger

Aero Car 
(Joseph L Halsmer, Lafayette, IN)
 Aero Car 1959 Monoplane (Model 1)?
 Aero Car two seater (Model 2)?
 Aero Car Model 3

Aero Commander 
(prev. Aero Design & Engr Corp, Culver City, CA, later Aero Commander division of Rockwell)
 Aero Commander 100
 Aero Commander 200
 Aero Commander 500
 Ag Commander
 Darter Commander
 Jet Commander
 Lark Commander
 Quail Commander
 Snipe Commander
 Sparrow Commander
 Thrush Commander

Aero Composites/Aero Composite Technologies
 Aero Composites Sea Hawk
 Aero Composites Sea Hawker

Aero Concepts
(Aero Concepts LLC, Gainesville, FL)
Aero Concepts Discovery

Aero Design and Engineering Company 
See also: Aero Commander, Rockwell
 Aero Commander 500 family

Aero Design Associates 
(Aero Design Associates (pres: David Garber), Opa-Locka, FL)
 Aero Design DG-1

Aero Designs 
(Aero Designs Inc, San Antonio, TX)
 Aero Designs Pulsar
 Aero Designs Pulsar XP
 Aero Designs SL-1 Star-Lite

Aero Dynamics 
(Aero Dynamics Ltd, Div of North American Aero Dynamics (Canada), Arlington, WA)
 Aero Dynamics Sparrow Hawk

Aero East Europe
(Kraljevo, Serbia)
Aero East Europe Sila

Aero Electric
(Aero Electric Aircraft Corporation)
 Aero Electric Sun Flyer

Aero Eli Servizi
(Aero Eli Servizi Costruzioni Aeronautiche)
 Aero Eli Servizi Yo-Yo 222

Aero Gare
 Aero Gare Sea Hawker

Aero Mercantil
(Aero Mercantil SA)
 Aero Mercantil EL1 Gavilan

Aero Mirage 
(Aero Mirage Inc, Gainesville, FL)
 Aero Mirage TC-2

Aero Nord
(Lorgies, and later Bénifontaine, France)
Aero Nord AIR

Aero Products 
(API/Aeronautical Products Inc)
 Aero Products A-1
 Aero Products A-3

Aero Research Limited
 De Bruyne Snark
 Ladybird

Aero Resources
(Aero Resources Inc, Gardena, CA)
 Aero Resources J-2
 Aero Resources Super J-2

Aéro Services Guépard
 Aéro Services Guépard Guépy
 Aéro Services Guépard Guépard 912
 Aéro Services Guépard Guépe
 Aéro Services Guépard Guépy Club
 Aéro Services Guépard Super Guépard
 Aéro Services Guépard SG10

Aero Spacelines 
(Aero Spacelines Inc, Van Nuys, CA)
 Aero Spacelines Guppy-101
 Aero Spacelines Guppy-201
 Aero Spacelines B-377GT Guppy-Turbine
 Aero Spacelines B-377MG Mini Guppy
 Aero Spacelines B-377MGT Mini Guppy Turbine
 Aero Spacelines B-377PG Pregnant Guppy
 Aero Spacelines B-377SG Super Guppy
 Aero Spacelines B-377SGT Super Guppy Turbine

Aero Sport 
(Aero Sport Aviation Co, 723 Ventura St, Santa Paula, CA)
 Aero Sport S-2 (S-1?)

Aero-Sport International 
 Aero-Sport Kahu

Aero Synergie
(Aero Synergie SARL, Villefranche-de-Rouergue, France)
Aero Synergie Jodel D20
Aero Synergie Joker J300
Aero Synergie Papango

Aero Vodochody 
 Aero Ae 01
 Aero Ae 02	
 Aero Ae 03		1	Single piston engine monoplane reconnaissance airplane
 Aero Ae 04
 Aero A.8	1921	1	Single piston engine biplane airliner
 Aero A.10	1922	5	Single piston engine biplane airliner
 Aero A.11	1925	~250	Single piston engine biplane light bomber
 Aero A.12	1923	93	Single piston engine biplane light bomber
 Aero A.14	1922		Single piston engine biplane reconnaissance airplane
 Aero A.15			Single piston engine biplane reconnaissance airplane
 Aero DH.50			License built single piston engine biplane airliner[32]
 Aero A.16			Unbuilt biplane bomber
 Aero A.17			Glider
 Aero A.18	1923	20	Single piston engine biplane fighter
 Aero A.19			Single piston engine biplane fighter
 Aero A.20	1923	1	Single piston engine biplane fighter
 Aero A.21	1926	8	Single piston engine biplane trainer
 Aero A.22		3	Single piston engine biplane utility airplane
 Aero A.22 (II)			Unbuilt four engine heavy bomber
 Aero A.23	1926	7	Single piston engine biplane airliner
 Aero A.24	1925	1	Twin piston engine biplane bomber
 Aero A.25		15	Single piston engine biplane trainer
 Aero A.26	1923	23	Single piston engine biplane reconnaissance airplane
 Aero A.27			Twin piston engine biplane bomber
 Aero A.27 (II)			Unbuilt twin engine airliner
 Aero A.28		Trainer
 Aero A.29	1926	9	Single piston engine biplane reconnaissance floatplane
 Aero A.30	1926	79	Single piston engine biplane light bomber
 Aero A.31			Unbuilt fighter
 Aero A.32 1927	116	Single piston engine biplane light bomber
 Aero A.33			Unbuilt three engine airliner
 Aero A.34 Kos	1929	11	Single piston engine biplane sport airplane
 Aero A.35	1928	12	Single piston engine high-wing monoplane airliner
 Aero A.36			Unbuilt three engine biplane bomber
 Aero A.38	1929	6	Single piston engine biplane airliner
 Aero A.40			Unbuilt racing airplane
 Aero A.42	1929	2	Single piston engine monoplane bomber
 Aero A.44			Unbuilt twin engine bomber
 Aero A.46	1931	1	Single piston engine biplane trainer
 Aero A.48			Unbuilt airliner
 Aero A.49			Unbuilt ultralight
 Aero A.55			Unbuilt ultralight
 Aero A.60			Unbuilt three engine transport airplane
 Aero A.100	1933	44	Single piston engine biplane light bomber
 Aero A.101	1934	50	Single piston engine biplane light bomber
 Aero A.102	1934	2	Single piston engine monoplane fighter
 Aero A.104	1937	2	Single piston engine monoplane bomber
 Aero A.125		12	Single piston engine biplane trainer
 Aero A.130		1	Single piston engine biplane light bomber
 Aero A.134		1	Single piston engine biplane sport airplane
 Aero A.200	1934	2	Single piston engine monoplane sport airplane
 Aero MB.200	1935	74	License built twin piston engine monoplane bomber
 Aero A.202			Unbuilt twin engine airliner
 Aero A.204	1936	1	Twin piston engine monoplane airliner
 Aero A.206			Prototype twin piston engine monoplane bomber
 Aero A.210			Unbuilt four engine airliner
 Aero A.212			Unbuilt utility airplane
 Aero A.230		25	Single piston engine biplane light bomber
 Aero A.300	1938	1	Twin piston engine monoplane bomber
 Aero A.302			Unbuilt attack airplane
 Aero A.304	1937	19	Twin piston engine monoplane bomber
 Aero A.321			Single piston engine biplane light bomber
 Aero A.330			Single piston engine biplane light bomber
 Aero A.351			
 Aero A.404			Unbuilt twin piston engine monoplane bomber
 Aero A.430			Single piston engine biplane light bomber
 Aero C-3			License built twin piston engine monoplane trainer
 Aero C-4/C-104		License built single piston engine biplane trainer
 Aero C-103		License built twin piston engine monoplane airliner
 Aero D-44			License built twin piston engine monoplane transport
 Aero Ae-45	1947	200	Twin piston engine monoplane utility airplane
 Aero Ae 50	1949	1	Single piston engine monoplane reconnaissance airplane
 Aero Ae-53			Prototype transport glider
 LB P-1		Unbuilt twin engine trainer
 LB P-16			Unbuilt four engine airliner
 Aero Ae-148			Unbuilt twin engine airliner
 Aero B-34			Unbuilt attack airplane
 Aero HC-2 Heli Baby	1954	23	Single piston engine utility helicopter
 Aero L-60 Brigadýr	1953	273	Single piston engine monoplane utility airplane
 Aero L-260		Single piston engine monoplane utility airplane
 Aero L-29 Delfín	1959		Single jet engine monoplane trainer
 Aero L-229		
 Aero L-260			
 Aero L-360			
 Aero L-429			
 Aero S-102	
 Aero S-103	
 Aero S-104
 Aero S-105			
 Aero S-106	
 Aero L-39 Albatross	
 Aero L-270	
 Aero L-59 Super Albatross	
 Aero Ae 270 Ibis	
 Aero L-159 ALCA	
 Aero L-39NG	
 Aero F/A-259 Striker

Aero-Astra 
(Aviatsionnyy Nauchno-Yekhnicheskiy Tsentr Aero-Astra (Aero-Astra))
 Aero-Astra Okhotnik 1
 Aero-Astra Okhotnik 2
 Aero-Astra Okhotnik 2M
 Aero-Astra Okhotnik 3

Aero-Cam 
 Aero-Cam Slick 360

Aéro-Club de Nice 
 Aéro-Club de Nice Mistralet

Aéro-Club de Surenses 
 Aéro-Club de Surenses Abeille

Aéro-Club des Cheminots 
 Aero-Club des Cheminots Aerofer

Aéro-Club des Métallurgistes 
 Aéro-Club des Métallurgistes Métalair

Aéro-Club du Jura 
 Aéro-Club du Jura CAP Dolé

Aéro-Club du Rhône et du Sud-Est 
 Aéro-Club du Rhône et du Sud-Est J3

Aero-Craft 
(Aero-Craft Mfg Co Inc, Detroit, MI)
 Aero-Craft Aero-Coupe

Aero-Difusión 
 Aero-Difusión D11 Compostela
 Aero-Difusión D-112 Popuplane
 Aero-Difusión D-119 Popuplane
 Aero-Difusión D-1190S Compostela

Aero-Flight 
(Aero-Flight Aircraft Corp (Pres: J K Nagamatsu), Buffalo, NY)
 Aero-Flight Streak

Aero-Kros
(Aero-Kros Sp, z o. o., Krosno, Poland)
Aero-Kros MP-02 Czajka

Aero-Service Jacek Skopiński
(Warsaw, Poland)
Aero-Service Panda
Aero-Service Puma

Aero-Tech 
(Aero-Tech (pres: Alvin J Jarvis), Hastings, FL)
 Aero-Tech Boeing F4B/P-12C 4/5 scale replica

Aero-Works 
 Aero-Works Aerolite 103

Aeroálcool
(Aeroálcool Tecnologia Ltda - Aeronaves, São Paulo, Brazil)
Aeroálcool Quasar Lite
Aeroálcool Quasar Fast 
Aeroálcool Quasar Baby

AeroAndina 
 Agricopteros autogyro 
 Agricopteros Scamp B
 Agricopteros Gold-Wing
 AeroAndina MXP-100 Aventura
 AeroAndina MXP-150 Kimbaya
 AeroAndina MXP-158 Embera
 AeroAndina MXP-640 Amigo
 AeroAndina MXP-650 Amigo-S
 AeroAndina MXP-740 Savannah
 AeroAndina MXP-740-F	
 AeroAndina MXP-750
 AeroAndina MXP-800 Fantasy-Calima
 AeroAndina MXP-1000 Tayrona

AeroCad
(AeroCad Inc, Florissant, MO)
AeroCad AeroCanard

Aerocar 
 Aerocar 2000

Aerocar 
(Aerocar International / Aerocar Inc.)
 Aerocar I
 Aerocar II Aero-Plane
 Aerocar III
 Aerocar Bullet
 Aerocar Coot
 Aerocar Super-Coot
 Aerocar IMP ('Independently Made Plane')
 Aerocar Mini-IMP
 Aerocar Micro-IMP
 Aerocar Ultra-IMP
 Taylor Bullet

Aérocentre 
(See Société Nationale de Constructions Aéronautiques du Centre SNCAC)

Aerochia
 Aerochia LT-1

Aerochute International
(Coburg North, Victoria, Australia)
Aerochute International Dual

Aerocomp 
see:-Comp Air
(Aerocomp Inc, Merritt Island, FL)

Aerocomp AB
(Alingsas, Sweden)
Aerocomp VM-1 Esqual

AeroCopter
 AeroCopter Futura (2003)
Just to precise this an autogyro.

Aerocraft
(Aerocraft R&D)
 Aerocraft Stealth Star 204 SS

AeroDreams 
AeroDreams Chi-7

Aerodyne 
(Aerodyne Systems Engineering Ltd.)
 Aerodyne M74 Wasp
 Aerodyne M79 Hornet

Aerodyne Systems 
 Aerodyne Systems Vector 600
 Aerodyne Systems Vector 610
 Aerodyne Systems Vector 627
 Aerodyne Systems Vector 627SR

Aerodyne Technologies
(Talloires, France)
Aerodyne Blaster
Aerodyne Cherokee
Aerodyne Cool
Aerodyne Dune
Aerodyne Freestyle
Aerodyne Joy
Aerodyne Jumbe
Aerodyne Massai
Aerodyne Shaman
Aerodyne Shani
Aerodyne Shaolin
Aerodyne Shoot
Aerodyne Totem Bi
Aerodyne Yogi

Aerodynos 
(Aerodynos de Colombia)
 Aerodynos JA 177 Evolution I
 Aerodynos JA 177 Evolution II
 Aerodynos JA 177 Pingouin

Aeroflying
(Saint-Andre des Eaux, France)
Aeroflying Sensation

Aeroitba
(ITBA, Buenos Aires, Argentina)
 Aeroitba Petrel 912i

AeroJames
(Ajaccio, France)
AeroJames 01 Isatis

Aerokopter 
 Aerokopter ZA-6 San'ka
 Aerokopter AK1
 Aerokopter AK1-3 San'ka
 Aerokopter AK1-3CX
 Aerokopter AK1-5 San'ka

AeroKuhlmann 
(AeroKuhlmann, La Ferté Alais, Cerny)
 AeroKuhlmann Scub

Aerola 
 Aerola Alatus

Aerolab
(Aerolab SRL, Gallarate, Italy)
Aerolab BiCamp
Aerolab HiCamp
Aerolab LoCamp

AeroLift 
 AeroLift CycloCrane

AeroLites Inc. 
(AeroLites Inc. (Pres: Daniel J Rochè), Welsh, LA)
 AeroLites Bearcat
 AeroLites Ag Bearcat
 AeroLites Sport Bearcat
 AeroLites AeroMaster AG 
 AeroLites AeroSkiff

Aeromarine
 Aeromarine 1909 Flying Boat
 Aeromarine 8
 Aeromarine 39
 Aeromarine 40
 Aeromarine 50
 Aeromarine 52
 Aeromarine 55
 Aeromarine 60
 Aeromarine 75
 Aeromarine 80
 Aeromarine 85
 Aeromarine 700
 Aeromarine AM-1 1923 mailplane
 Aeromarine AM-2 1923 mailplane
 Aeromarine AM-3 Night Mail Carrier
 Aeromarine AMC
 Aeromarine AS
 Aeromarine AT
 Aeromarine BM-1 1924 mailplane
 Aeromarine CO-L
 Aeromarine DH-4B
 Aeromarine EO
 Aeromarine EDO Model B
 Aeromarine HS
 Aeromarine M-1
 Aeromarine NBS-1
 Aeromarine PG-1
 Aeromarine WM
 Aeromarine Limousine Flying Boat
 Aeromarine Navy Flying Cruiser
 Aeromarine Messenger
 Aeromarine Sea Scout
 Aeromarine Seaplane
 Aeromarine Sportsman

Aeromarine-Klemm
 Aeromarine-Klemm AKL-25
 Aeromarine-Klemm AKL-26
 Aeromarine-Klemm AKL-27
 Aeromarine-Klemm AKL-60
 Aeromarine-Klemm AKL-70
 Aeromarine-Klemm Model 70 Trainer

Aeromarine-LSA
(South Lakeland Airport, FL)
Aeromarine Merlin

Aeromere 
 Aeromere Falco
 Aeromere M-100

AeroMobil
 AeroMobil 3.0
 AeroMobil 4.0
 AeroMobil 5.0

Aeromobile 
(Aeromobile Safety Plane Syndicate, 215 Thayer Bldg, Norwich, CT)
 Aeromobile Safety Plane

Aeromod 
(Aeromod Inc (pres: E W Moore), N Little Rock, AR)
 Loadstar Model 100

Aeromot 
(Aeromot, Brazil)
 Aeromot AMT-100 Ximango
 Aeromot AMT-100P Ximango
 Aeromot AMT-100R Ximango
 Aeromot AMT-200 Super Ximango
 Aeromot AMT-200S Super Ximango S
 Aeromot AMT-300 Turbo Xiamango Shark 
 Aeromot AMT-300R Reboque
 Aeromot AMT-600 Guri
 Aeromot TG-14A (USAF:AMT-200 Super Ximango)

Aéronautic 2000
 Aéronautic 2000 Baroudeur

Aeronautica Bonomi 
(Vittorio Bonomi & Camillo Silva / Aeronautica Bonomi)
 Bonomi BS.15 Bigiarella
 Bonomi BS.17 Allievo Cantù
 Bonomi BS.19 Alca
 Bonomi BS.22 Alzavola

Aeronautica Lombarda
(Aeronautica Lombarda S.A.)
 Aeronautica Lombarda AL-3
 Aeronautica Lombarda GP.2 Asiago
 Aeronautica Lombarda AL-12P
 Aeronautica Lombarda A.R. 
 Assalto Radioguidato

Aeronáutica Militar Española
 AME VI

Aeronautica Predappio
 Aeronautica Predappio Nuova

Aeronautica Umbra
 Aeronautica Umbra Trojani AUT.18
 Aeronautica Umbra Trojani MB.902
 Aeronautica Umbra AUM-903

Aeronautical Engineering Co 
See:Abreu

Aeronautical Manufacturing Enterprise
(Aeronautical Manufacturing Enterprise - Algeria)
 Aeronautical Manufacturing Enterprise Fernas-142
 Aeronautical Manufacturing Enterprise Safir-43

Aeronautical Products
See:Aero Products

Aeronava
 Aeronava Ag-6

Aeronca 
(Aeronautical Corp of America)
 Aeronca 6
 Aeronca 7 Champion
 Aeronca 9 Arrow
 Aeronca 11 Chief
 Aeronca 12 Chum
 Aeronca 15 Sedan
 Aeronca 50 Chief
 Aeronca 60 Tandem
 Aeronca 65 Super Chief
 Aeronca Tandem
 Aeronca Defender
 Aeronca C-1 Cadet
 Aeronca C-2
 Aeronca C-3
 Aeronca CF Scout
 Aeronca K
 Aeronca LA
 Aeronca LB
 Aeronca LC
 Aeronca LCS
 Aeronca LNR (XLNR-1)
 Aeronca L-3 Grasshopper
 Aeronca O-58 Grasshopper
 Aeronca L-16
 Aeronca TG-5
 Aeronca TG-33
 Aeronca Monowheel Racer

Aeronca
Aeronca 100
Aeronca 300
Ely 700

Aeroneer
seePhillips

Aeroneering
 Miller Lil' Rascal

Aeronix 
(Aronix sarl, La Chapelle-Vendômoise, France)
 Aeronix Airelle

Aeropepe
(Aeropepe, Recife, Brazil)
 Flamingo

Aeropilot
(Aeropilot SRO, Calav, Czech Republic)
Aeropilot Legend 540

Aeroplastika
(Avia Baltika / Aeroplastika)
 Aeroplastika LAK-X

Aeroprakt
(Ukraine:Kiev / Russian Federation:LM Aeropract Samara / KB Aeropract / Aeropract JSC)
 Aeroprakt T-8
 Aeroprakt A-6 White
 Aeroprakt A-11M Hamlet
 Aeroprakt A-15
 Aeroprakt A-19
 Aeroprakt A-20
 Aeroprakt A-21 Solo
 Aeroprakt A-22 (L / Foxbat / Vision / Valor / Shark)
 Aeroprakt A-23 Dragon
 Aeroprakt A-24 Viking
 Aeroprakt A-25 Breeze
 Aeroprakt A-26 Vulcan
 Aeroprakt A-27
 Aeroprakt A-28 Victor
 Aeroprakt A-30 Vista Speedster
 Aeroprakt A-32 Vixxen
 Aeroprakt A-33 Dragon
 Aeroprakt A-36 Super Vulcan
 Aeroprakt A-41
 Aeroprakt AP-55

Aeropro CZ
 Aeropro Eurofox

Aeroprogress/ROKS-Aero 
 ROS-Aeroprogress T-101 Grach
 Aeroprogress T-106 Orel 2
 Aeroprogress T-108 Zolotoy Orel
 Aeroprogress T-110
 Aeroprogress T-112
 Aeroprogress T-121 Grif
 Aeroprogress T-130 Fregat
 Aeroprogress T-132
 Aeroprogress T-134
 Aeroprogress T-204 Progress
 Aeroprogress T-205
 Aeroprogress T-208 Orel
 Aeroprogress T-21 Sapsan
 Aeroprogress T-401 Sokol
 Aeroprogress T-407 Skborets
 Khrunichev T-411 Aist
 Aeroprogress T-415
 Aeroprogress T-423
 Aeroprogress T-433 Flamingo
 Aeroprogress T-435 Korvet
 Aeroprogress T-455
 Aeroprogress T-501 Strizh
 Aeroprogress T-504 Skborets
 Aeroprogress F-504 fighter
 Aeroprogress F-505 Strekoza
 Aeroprogress F-572
 Aeroprogress T-602 Orel
 Aeroprogress T-610 Voyazh
 Aeroprogress T-710 Anaconda
 Aeroprogress T-720
 Aeroprogress T-730
 Aeroprogress T-752
 Aeroprogress T-910 Kuryer

Aeroput
(Aeroput workshops, Zemun, Belgrade)
 Aeroput MMS-3

Aeroric 
(AERORIC NAUCHNO-PROIZVODSTVENNOYE PREDPRIYATIE OOO (Aeroric Scientific-Production Enterprise Ltd))
 Aeroric Dingo

Aeros 
(Kiev, Ukraine)
 Aeros-1
 Aeros-2
 Aeros AC-21 
 Aeros AL-12
 Aeros Accent
 Aeros ANT
 Aeros Amigo
 Aeros Combat
 Aeros Cross Country
 Aeros Discus
 Aeros Fox
 Aeros Fuego
 Aeros Mister X
 Aeros Phaeton
 Aeros Rival
 Aeros Sky Ranger
 Aeros Stealth
 Aeros Stalker
 Aeros Target
 Aeros Style
 Aeros Virtuoso
 Aeros Vitamin
 Aeros Zig-Zag

Aeros del Sur
(Argentina)
Aeros del Sur Manta

Aeros SRO (CZ)
(Kutná Hora, Czech Republic)
Aeros UL-2000 Flamingo

AeroSamara
 AeroSamara F-41 Elbrus

Aeroscraft
 Aeroscraft ML866
 Aeroscraft ML868

Aeroscript 
(Aeroscript Corp (Morris Kamar, Pincus Cashman, Minnie Israel), New York, NY)
 Aeroscript 1929 Aeroplane

Aerosette
(Aerosette SRO, Chrastava, Czech Republic)
Aerosette MH-46 Eclipse

Aerosonde Ltd 
 Insitu Aerosonde

Aerospace
 Aerospace Airtrainer
 Aerospace Fletcher
 Aerospace Cresco

Aerospace General
 Aerospace General Mini-Copter

Aérospatiale 
(Société Nationale d'Industrie Aérospatiale)
 Aérospatiale Caravelle 12
 Aérospatiale Corvette (SN600 series)
 Aérospatiale Cougar (AS530 series)
 Aérospatiale Panther (AS560 series)
 Aérospatiale Puma (SA330 series)
 Aérospatiale Dauphin (SA360 series)
 Aérospatiale Dauphin 2 (SA365 series)
 Aérospatiale Dolphin (USCG SA366G)
 Aérospatiale Fregate (N262/Mohawk298)
 Aérospatiale Epsilon (TB-30)
 Aérospatiale Gazelle (SA-340 series)
 Aérospatiale Lama (SA-315)
 Aérospatiale Ludion
 Aérospatiale Omega (TB-31)
 Aérospatiale Ecureuil (AS/SA-350 series)
 Aérospatiale AStar
 Aérospatiale TwinStar
 Aérospatiale Super-Caravelle (SE-121 series)
 Aérospatiale Super Puma (SA332 series)
 Aérospatiale-BAC Concorde
 Aérospatiale C.22
 Aérospatiale Fouga 90
 Aérospatiale N 500
 Aérospatiale AGV
 Aérospatiale AS.100
 Aérospatiale ATSF
 Aérospatiale Pégase
 Aérospatiale SA.331 Puma Makila
 Aérospatiale X.380
 Aérospatiale Dauphin 2 CDVE
 Aérospatiale/CATIC p. 120L

Aerospool
(Aerospool SRO, Prievidza, Slovakia)
Aerospool WT9 Dynamic
Aerospool WT10 Advantic

Aerosport OY
(Keila, Estonia)
Aerosport OY Evo
Aerosport OY Spider
Aerosport OY Sport
Aerosport OY Sport Next
Aerosport OY Sport Power
Aerosport OY Sport+
Aerosport OY Trike PT1+1
Aerosport OY Trike T1+1
Aerosport OY Trike PT2

Aerosport
(Aerosport Pty. Ltd.)
 Aerosport Supapup Mk 4

Aerosport
(Aerosport Inc (Fdr: Harris L Woods), Holly Springs, NC)
 Aerosport Quail
 Aerosport Rail
 Aerosport Scamp
 Aerosport Woody Pusher

AeroSports Gr
 G-AeroSports Lygistis
 G-AeroSports SF/1 Archon
 G-Aerosports G802 Atairon

Aerostar 
(Aerostar Aircraft Corp, Coeur d'Alene, ID)
 Aerostar 700
 Aerostar Super 700
 Aerostar FJ-100

Aerostar 
(Butler Aviation, Kerrville, TX)
 Aerostar Executive
 Aerostar Ranger

Aerostar
(Aerostar SA, Bacău, Romania)
Aerostar R40S Festival
Aerostar (Yakovlev) Iak-52
 Aerostar 01
 Aerostar AG-6

Aérostructure
(Aérostructure arl, France)
 Aérostructure Lutin 80

Aerostyle Ultraleicht Flugzeuge
 Aerostyle Breezer

Aerosud 
 Advanced High Performance Reconnaissance Light Aircraft

AeroTalleres Guarani 
 AeroTalleres Guarani Paraguay 1

Aerotec 
(Technologías Aeronauticas S.A. – Colombia)
See: AeroAndina

Aerotec
(Aerotec S/A Industria Aeronáutica)
 Aerotec A-122 Uirapuru
 Aerotec A-132 Tangará
 Aerotec A-135 Tangará II
 Aerotec T-23
 Aerotec T-23B
 Aerotec T-23C

Aerotécnica
 Aerotécnica AC-11
 Aerotécnica AC-12
 Aerotécnica AC-13
 Aerotécnica AC-14
 Aerotécnica AC-15
 Aerotécnica AC-21
 Aerotécnica EC-XZ-2
 Aerotécnica EC-XZ-4

Aerotechnics
(Brandenburg Germany)
Aerotechnics Skyhopper-3000

Aerotechnik 
(Evektor-Aerotechnik, Kunovice, Czech Republic)
 Aerotechnik L-13 SDL Vivat
 Aerotechnik L-13 SDM Vivat				
 Aerotechnik L-13 SE Vivat			
 Aerotechnik L-13 SL Vivat
 Aerotechnik L-13 SW Vivat
 Aerotechnik A-70

Aerotechnik, Entwicklung und Apparatebau
(Aerotechnik, Entwicklung und Apparatebau GmbH)
 Aerotechnik WGM.21
 Aerotechnik WGM.22

Aerotek 
(Aerotek II, 1042 S Washington St, Afton, WY)
 Call-Air B-1
 Call-Air B-1A

Aerotique 
(Aerotique Aviation, United States)
 Aerotique Parasol

AeroVironment 
 AeroVironment SkyTote
 NASA Pathfinder
 NASA Pathfinder Plus
 NASA Centurion
 NASA Helios
 NASA Pathfinder
 Solar Challenger
 Solar Impulse

AeroVolga 
 AeroVolga L-6
 AeroVolga LA-8 (Flkagman)
 AeroVolga Borey
 AeroVolga DS-18
 AeroVolga AS-5.0
 AeroVolga TCA-AMH23

AESL 
(Aero Engine Services Ltd)
 AESL CT-4 Airtrainer

Aetna 
(Aetna Aircraft Corp, Glendale, CA)
 Aetna Aerocraft 2SA (later Aetna 2SA)

AFCO 
(AFCO Shipyard company - India)
 AFCO RL-3 Monsoon

Affordaplane Aircraft
 Affordaplane

AFG Memel 
(Allgemeine Flug-Gesellschaft Memel)
 AFG.1

AFU
(Aktiengesellschaft für Flugzeugunternehmungen)
 AFU AA-7
 AFU AJ-7
 AFU AR-7

Aggergaard 
(Arthur & Peter Aggergaard, Viborg, SD)
 Aggergaard A-1

AGO 
(AGO Flugzeugwerke (Aktien Gesellschaft Otto) - Johannistal / for Aeroplanbau Gustav Otto & Alberti see Otto)
 AGO Wasserdoppeldecker 1914
 AGO C.I
 AGO C.I-W
 AGO C.II
 AGO C.II-W
 AGO C.III
 AGO C.IV
 AGO C.VII
 AGO C.VIII
 AGO DV.3
 AGO S.I
 AGO Ao 192 Kurier (Courier)
 AGO Ao 225
 AGO W.II

Agrocopteros 
(Agrocopteros Ltda.)
See: AeroAndina

Agusta 
(Construzioni Aeronautiche Giovanni Agusta)
 Agusta B.6
 CAGA Agusta AG.2.
 Agusta P.110
 Agusta A.101
 Agusta A.102
 Agusta A.103
 Agusta A.104
 Agusta A.104BT
 Agusta A.105
 Agusta A.106
 Agusta A.109
 Agusta A.115
 Agusta A.119
 Agusta A.129 Mangusta
 Agusta-Zappata AZ-8L
 Agusta AZ.101G
 Agusta CP-110
 Agusta-Bell AB.47G
 Agusta-Bell AB.102
 Agusta-Bell AB.139
 Agusta-Bell AB.204
 Agusta-Bell AB.204AS
 Agusta-Bell AB.205
 Agusta-Bell AB.206 JetRanger
 Agusta-Bell AB.212
 Agusta-Bell AB.212ASW
 Agusta-Bell AB.214A
 Agusta-Sikorsky HH-3F
 Agusta-Sikorsky S-61A-4
 Agusta-Sikorsky SSH-3D
 Meridionali/Agusta EMA 124

AgustaWestland
 AgustaWestland AW101
 AgustaWestland EH101
 AgustaWestland CH-148 Petrel Canadian Armed Forces
 AgustaWestland CH-149 Chimo Canadian Armed Forces
 AgustaWestland CH-149 Cormorant Canadian Armed Forces
 AgustaWestland Merlin
 AgustaWestland AW109
 AgustaWestland AW119 Koala
 AgustaWestland AW129 Mangusta
 AgustaWestland AW139
 AgustaWestland AW149
 AgustaWestland AW159 Wildcat
 AgustaWestland AW169
 AgustaWestland AW189
 AgustaWestland AW249

Ahill
 Ahill-2

Ahlert
(Gebrüder Ahlert)
 Ahlert flugboot

Ahrens 
(Ralph Ahrens, Tacoma, WA)
 Ahrens A

Ahrens 
(Ahrens Aircraft Corp, Oxnard, CA)
 Ahrens AR 404

Ahrens & Schulz
 Ahrens & Schulz L 1 "Blauer Heinrich"
 Ahrens & Schulz L 2

AHRLAC
(AHRLAC Holdings (Advanced High Performance Reconnaissance Light Aircraft))
 AHRLAC Holdings Ahrlac

References

Further reading

External links

 List of aircraft (0-A)